Steve Green (born May 28, 1960) is an American politician and member of the Minnesota House of Representatives. A member of the Republican Party of Minnesota, he represents District 2B in northwestern Minnesota, which includes most of Becker County, southern Clearwater County, southern Hubbard County, Mahnomen County, northeastern Otter Tail County and northern Wadena County.

Education and career
Green graduated from Fosston High School in 1978. He later attended the Detroit Lakes Area Vocational Technical Institute. Green operated a greenhouse for 23 years. His parents started Lakeland Greenhouse in 1973. He took it over in 1981 and continued the family tradition until 2004. Green now makes his living in construction and carpentry work. He has been a self-employed businessman for 31 years. Green had been politically active in the Republican Party for about eight years, and had previously been a candidate in 2010 and 2008 for District 2A.

Minnesota House of Representatives

Elections
Green was first elected to the Minnesota House of Representatives in 2012 and reelected in 2014.

Committee assignments
For the 89th legislative session, Green is a member of:
Greater Minnesota Economic and Workforce Development Policy Committee (vice chair)
Environment and Natural Resources Policy and Finance Committee
Legacy Funding Finance Committee

For the 88th legislative session, Green was a member of:
Capital Investment Committee 
Environment and Natural Resources Policy Committee 
Housing Finance and Policy Committee 
Legacy Committee

Tenure
Green was sworn in on January 8, 2013. He has served in the 88th and 89th Minnesota Legislatures.

Personal life
Green and his wife, Cindy, have six children and reside in Fosston, Minnesota. He is self-employed.

References

External links

 Rep. Steve Green official Minnesota House of Representatives website
 Rep. Steve Green official campaign website

1960 births
21st-century American politicians
Living people
Native American state legislators in Minnesota
Republican Party members of the Minnesota House of Representatives
People from Polk County, Minnesota